"All I Can Be (Is a Sweet Memory)" is a song written by Harlan Howard and recorded by American country music artist Conway Twitty for his 1985 album Chasin' Rainbows, and Johnny Rodriguez for his 1986 album Full Circle. In June 1991, American country music artist Collin Raye released it as the first single from his album All I Can Be. The song was Raye's debut single and reached No. 29 on the Billboard Hot Country Singles & Tracks chart.

Chart performance

References

1985 songs
1991 debut singles
Conway Twitty songs
Johnny Rodriguez songs
Collin Raye songs
Songs written by Harlan Howard
Epic Records singles